Tebyan Cultural Institute is a cultural and educational organization.

History 
The Tebyan Cultural Institute was founded in  2002  in Iran. Its Alexa internet ranking is 15 in Iran.

Activities 
 Publication of cultural information on the web 
 Supporting cultural products in  information technology
 Publication of  free of charge information on Tebyan's website
 Providing consultation in religious issues

The Tebyan cultural institute, which is affiliated to the organization "Sazman-e Tablighat-e Eslami", is one of the biggest and best known cultural institutes in Iran, and has cooperated with other cultural institutes in different fields for  supporting  cultural festivals and broadcasting their activities in the media.

The activities of the institute's take place not only in Tehran, but also in the provincial centers, and 1,600,000 users visit its website  each day.

The Iranian deputy minister supported its activities for sport and youth on the website tebyan.net in Tehran.

The new site of the  Tebyan Cultural Institute is called hamsan.tebyan.net and is run by the Islamic Development Organisation.

Notes

References 
 About tebyan on the BBC website
 About tebyan on the ABC news website
 About tebyan on the Iran Book News Agency website
 tebyan.net Traffic Statistics 
 About the Tebyan cultural institute
 About Tebyan on the Islamic Republic News Agency website, 2017
Gaming Globally: Production, Play, and Place, edited by N. Huntemann, B. Aslinger, p. 263, Nina B. Huntemann and Ben Aslinger, 2013
The Islamic Development Organization website, visited in 2017
The Islamic Development Organization website, 2017

External links 
  Tebyan cultural institute website

Cultural organisations based in Iran
Educational organisations based in Iran
Organizations established in 2002